Canterbury Park and Ride is a park and ride system operated by Stagecoach South East in the English historic cathedral city of Canterbury. It was designed to reduce pollution in the city centre.

History 
The Park and Ride scheme was launched in 1991. It was initially operated by the East Kent Road Car Company using three single-deck vehicles; the company was taken over by the Stagecoach Group in 1993. The service was then run by Stagecoach until 2008, when it was taken over by council-owned operator Kent Top Travel. The service returned to Stagecoach operation in the summer of 2013 after the five-year contract to Kent Top Travel expired. Stagecoach proposed improvements to the Park & Ride scheme including free wi-fi, extended operating hours and the use of a new fleet of environmentally friendly buses.

Operation 
Wincheap, Sturry Road and New Dover Road Park & Ride routes operate every 10 minutes while the Hospital Shuttle operates every 1
0 minutes.

The initial Stagecoach operation consisted of ALX200 and ALX400 buses in a silver and purple livery. Under Kent Top Travel ownership, a fleet of Volvo B9TL/Optare Olympus and Volvo B7RLE/Optare Esteem buses in a Lime and Silver "Love your city" branded livery. The current Stagecoach fleet consists of Enviro 300, Dennis Enviro 400 and Optare Solo SR buses in a branded white livery.

Routes 
The scheme currently has 4 routes with 3 running to Canterbury Bus Station in the city centre. Potential for further sites at Thanington, Cockering Farm and Harbledown were studied by the city council in 2009, but none were proceeded with.

Sturry Road Park & Ride 
This route runs from Sturry Road Park & Ride terminus along the A28/Sturry Road to Canterbury Bus Station, passing the Magistrates Court, City Wall and ASDA.

Wincheap Park & Ride 
This route runs from Wincheap Park & Ride terminus through the Wincheap Industrial Estate, past Pin Hill bus stop and the connection to the Chatham Main Line at Canterbury East, before ending at Canterbury Bus Station.

New Dover Road Park & Ride 
This route runs from New Dover Road Park & Ride terminus along Old Dover Road to Canterbury Bus Station, passing Canterbury Health Centre and returns via Old Dover Road and Canterbury College.

References

External links 
 Canterbury City Council website, Park & Ride page

Park and ride schemes in the United Kingdom